Great Oak High School is a public high school that lies at the base of Wolf Valley in Temecula, California, USA, in the Temecula Valley Unified School District. In 2009 and 2010, Great Oak High School was listed in Newsweek's annual top 1000 high schools in America. As of 2022, GOHS is ranked #1,097 nationally and ranked 157th in the State of California. Great Oak High School has been a California Distinguished School since 2009 and is also a California Gold Ribbon School.

In addition to an array of AP courses, Great Oak also offers the International Baccalaureate Diploma Programme. It has been an IB World School since 2006.

Athletics 
Great Oak High School's athletic teams are known as the Wolfpack and compete in California's CIF Southern Section. The school has boys' football, girls' and boys' basketball, girls' volleyball, girls' and boys' tennis, girls' and boys' water polo, girls' and boys' swimming, girls' and boys' golf, girls' and boys' soccer, track and field, cross country, boys' wrestling, baseball and softball, and girls' and boys' lacrosse. During the 2015-2016 school year, the school was able to include a Boys' Volleyball team which will compete against other schools in the CIF section.

State titles
 Girls' Cross Country: 2010, 2012, 2013, and 2014 - Division 1, California Interscholastic Federation State Champions. 2nd at Nike Cross Nationals in 2014 and NXN Nationals Runner
 Boys' Cross Country: 2014, 2015, and 2017 - Division 1, California Interscholastic Federation State Champions. Ranked #3 in the nation for the boys. During the 2015 CIF State Finals in Fresno, they won the state title in a record breaking time. They went on to win the 2015 Nike Cross Nationals in Portland, Oregon.

Competition Cheer, Dance and Step Teams 
Great Oak High School has varsity and junior varsity Competition Cheerleading teams that compete in the Southern California Varsity/USA and Jamz competitions. Also competing for GOHS are varsity and junior varsity dance and step teams. The Great Oak Step Team is nationally recognized and in 2015 received 3rd place at the National Step Association nationals in Florida.

National Titles
 Varsity Competition Cheer: 2015 National Champion (Varsity Show Cheer Level 2 Large), 2015 Jamz School Nationals, Las Vegas, Nevada.
 Varsity Competition Cheer: 2014 National Champion, 2014 Jamz School Nationals, Las Vegas, Nevada.

Activities 
Great Oak High School features more than 120 clubs and student organizations to appeal to a wide variety of extracurricular interests. Of these, five are competitive (Cybersecurity, Academic Decathlon, Mock Trial, Science Olympiad, Speech & Debate) and three are academic (California Scholarship Federation, National Honor Society, Spanish National Honor Society).

Great Oak High School's Speech & Debate Club regularly competes within the Citrus Belt Speech Region. They are currently ranked 19th in the National Forensics League Southern California District. In Debate they compete in Congressional Debate, Parliamentary Debate, and Public Forum Debate. For Speech the events they compete in are Original Oratory, Original Advocacy, Oratorical Interpretation, Duo Interpretation, Thematic Interpretation, Dramatic Interpretation, Humorous Interpretation, and Impromptu. In 2010-2011, they sent two students to the California High School Speech Association's State Tournament while in 2011-2012 they sent one.

In 2022, Great Oak Cybersecurity won the California Mayor's Cyber Cup (CMCC) which was honored by the Temecula City Council.

At the California High School Speech Association's 54th State Tournament Great Oak had its first finalist win. One student placed 7th in the Speech Tournament against over 1,000 speakers from all over the state.

Campus accommodations 
The school, which opened in August 2004, has 124 classrooms, of which several are specialized to meet the requirements of the curriculum including 6 open-use computer labs; 2 business computer labs; 14 science labs; a library; a foods and nutrition kitchen; ROTC with office and wardrobe rooms; 3 art rooms (1 ceramics); a computer repair classroom; a TV Video production studio; a print shop; a drafting room; construction technology; automotive repair shop; a gymnasium (which includes a dance room, a wrestling room, and a weight room); and the performing arts complex (which includes a band room, a choir room, and a black box drama room). The campus also includes athletic fields for baseball, softball, and soccer, outdoor basketball and volleyball courts, sand volleyball courts, 8 outdoor tennis courts and a stadium with a synthetic turf football/soccer field and rubberized track. A swim complex was completed in 2005, and an addition was completed during the 2017-18 school year. During the summer of 2015, the school installed solar panels throughout campus and the senior parking lot to increase energy efficiency and save money.

Notable alumni

Connor Brandt - Soccer player
Demetric Felton - Football player
Stephanie Malherbe - International soccer player for South Africa
Cindy Marina - Miss Universe 2019 contestant
Xenia Martinez - Singer
Jabin Sambrano - American football wide receiver
Cassidy Wolf - Miss Teen USA

References 

Educational institutions established in 2004
High schools in Riverside County, California
International Baccalaureate schools in California
Public high schools in California
Temecula, California
2004 establishments in California